The Silent Whales of Lunar Sea is the fifth full-length studio album by British folk metal band Skyclad. Its title is a homophonic pun: when said aloud in a non-rhotic accent (such as British or Australian accents) it sounds identical to "The Silent Wails of Lunacy".

Track listing
"Still Spinning Shrapnel" - 4:34
"Just What Nobody Wanted" - 4:48
"Art-Nazi" - 3:42
"Jeopardy" - 4:20
"Brimstone Ballet" - 4:13
"A Stranger in the Garden" - 5:27
"Another Fine Mess" - 6:15
"Turncoat Rebellion" - 2:06
"Halo of Flies" - 5:23
"Desperanto" (A Song for Europe?) - 3:29
"The Present Imperfect" - 4:04
"Dance of the Dandy Hound" - 2:29

Track 12 is only included on some versions

Personnel
Martin Walkyier: Lead Vocals
Dave Pugh: Acoustic & Electric Guitars, Banjo, Backing Vocals
Graeme English: Bass, Classical Guitar, Keyboards, Backing Vocals
Georgina Biddle: Fiddle, Keyboards, Backing Vocals
Keith Baxter: Drums, Percussion

Production
Produced By Kevin Ridley & Skyclad
Assistant Engineer: Rob Pemberton
Mastering: Howie Weinberg

References

Encyclopaedia Metallum bands by letter - S - Skyclad - The Silent Whales of Lunar Sea (retrieved 8-31-07)

1995 albums
Skyclad (band) albums
Noise Records albums